Schafkopf,  also called Bavarian Schafkopf, is a popular German trick-taking card game of the Ace-Ten family for four players that evolved, towards the end of the 19th century, from German Schafkopf. It is still very popular in Bavaria, where it is their national card game played by around two million people, but it also played elsewhere in Germany and in Austria. It is an official cultural asset and important part of the Old Bavarian and Franconian way of life. Schafkopf is a mentally demanding pastime that is considered "the supreme discipline of Bavarian card games" and "the mother of all trump games."

Its closest relatives are Doppelkopf and Skat. These three and the North American game of Sheepshead descend from an earlier game called German Solo which, in turn, is the German version of Quadrille. The earliest written reference to classical, or German, Schafkopf dates to 1803, although it only came to notice through the polite society of Altenburg in 1811. It was current in Franconia (northern Bavaria) in the first half of the 19th century, but the description of the modern Bavarian game dates to 1879 and, since then, it has become the dominant form, whereas German Schafkopf is only played in a number of local variants, for example, in the Palatinate as Alte Schoofkopp or Bauernstoss. Bierkopf and Mucken are simple variants which make a useful introduction to the more complex Schafkopf.

The rules of the Bavarian Schafkopf Club (Bayerischer Schafkopf-Verein) or the revised version by the Schafkopf School (Schafkopfschule) form guidelines for the detail of the game and the conduct of the players. However, unlike Skat, Schafkopf is not really seen as a sport, but purely as a leisure activity. As a result, a large number of traditional rules and variants are used in private games, which can vary considerably from region to region. The name is sometimes spelt Schaffkopf,() Schafkopfen or, historically, Schaafkopf. To play Schafkopf is Schafkopfen and players may be called Schafkopfer.

History

Etymology 

There are various theories about the origin of the name Schafkopf, most of which come from traditional folklore. One suggestion is that Schafkopf acquired its name at a time when it was played for up to nine or twelve points which were marked with a piece of chalk as lines on a board, gradually forming the stylized appearance of a sheep's head (German: Schaf = sheep, Kopf = head). However, evidence of such notation is not found in the Bavarian context where it was invariably played for money.

Until the late 1960s, the alternative spelling Schaffkopf was not uncommon in Bavaria; the ensuing discussion about the supposedly only correct form and its origin was the subject of extensive debate at that time - among other things in the columns of the Bavarian press - before the common variant Schafkopf became widely accepted from about 1970. The issue was largely forgotten when author Wolfgang Peschel argued in the early 1990s for the double 'f' spelling based on the popular traditional view that, in earlier times, the game was supposed to have been played (geklopft) on the lids (Köpfen) of barrels (Upper German: Schaff, c.f. Schäffler/Scheffel). To this day, such casks are used as tables at beer stands and beer halls. Although this hypothesis is unanimously rejected by experts and there is no evidence for it in older sources, it is widespread on the Internet.

Another theory is that it comes from "Schaffen" and "Kopf", "to work one's brain."

Forerunners 
The indirect precursors of the various games of the Schafkopf family (which include Doppelkopf and Skat), were the Spanish national game of L'Hombre (which had reached the Holy Roman Empire through the courtly circles of France in the late 17th century), its four-hand variant, Quadrille, and its simplified German derivative, German Solo. The distinction between variable and permanent trump cards as well as the selection of a contract by announcing and bidding, probably originate from these games.

The special feature of Bavarian Schafkopf, the selection of a playing partner by 'calling' a Sow (= Deuce, but often called an Ace), was also usual in German Solo; the determination of the winning team by counting card points (Augen), instead of tricks, however, has another origin, perhaps in Bavarian Tarock or related games.

A possible ancestor of Schafkopf is the game of Scharwenzel, first recorded in Leipzig in 1715, but this is known in two forms. In northern Germany, Scharwenzel is a plain-trick game resembling German Solo but with the 4 Unters as permanent trumps below the Q, trump 7 and Q. In Bavaria there was a different game that was related to Färbeln and Grobhäusern in which the 4 Unters and possibly 4 Nines were wild.

Emergence and development 

The origin and development of the game of Schafkopf - in comparison with Skat - are rather poorly documented. This may be due, on the one hand, to its relatively low social reputation - in the first half of the 19th century Schafkopf was regarded as a comparatively unfashionable and simple "farmer's game" when seen against the backdrop of ever more popular card games (such as German Solo or Skat), especially at the universities - and, on the other hand, to changes in concept: originally the name referred to several forerunners, located more or less in the Saxon-Thuringian area such as Wendish or German Schafkopf. In these older variants, the declarer's team was generally determined by a combination of the two highest trump cards, in a not dissimilar manner to the way the Queens of Clubs are used in Doppelkopf today, for example. The variants played in the Palatinate  and in the USA (especially in Minnesota, c.f. Sheepshead) should be understood as further developments of this German Schafkopf. The assumption often heard in Bavaria that Skat and Doppelkopf developed from the Bavarian Schafkopf cannot be proven; a parallel development of all three games is more likely.

The game of Schafkopf is first recorded in the 1780s in the literature. In Hartmann's comedy, The Thankful Daughter (Die Dankbare Tochter) published in 1780, Platz tells his brother that "I thought we'd play a Schaafkopf" and they go to look for a pack of cards.
It also appears in a 1782 Saxon schedule of penalties, Drinking and Gaming on Workdays and Sundays (Zechen und Spielen an Werktagen und Sonntagen), typically with the remark that, unlike Hazard for example, it was not to be considered a game of chance in the legal sense and was thus permitted.

The specifically Bavarian variant of the game originated with the introduction of the Rufer or 'Call Ace' contract in the first half of the 19th century - apparently in Franconia. The first clear mention of a game of Schafkopf played according to Bavarian rules (in Gräfenberg) dates to the year 1849; and while Schapfkopf playing in Franconia was already widespread in the 1840s, in the Bavarian Forest, Tarock (the Bavarian game, not the true Tarock game played in Austria) was more popular. The question about the origin of the Bavarian Schafkopf cannot be answered conclusively, but available sources suggest a migration from north to south.

Schafkopf competitions were frequently reported in the newspapers along with unusual feats. In Pasing in 1888, it was reported that, in a game of "the noble Schaffkopf" a player had won a Solo without possessing a single matador. A few days later in Freyung, a player was dealt all eight matadors, a feat now known as a Sie. In 1929, it was reported that, in Türkenfeld a player won a Bell Solo by 4 points with the Ace and Nine of Leaves, but not a single Unter.

The earliest clear description of the game appears in a poem, Das edle Schafkopf-Spiel ("The Noble Game of Schafkopf") in the Regensburger Conversations-Blatt in 1876 which not only lists all 14 trumps, but also the contracts of Rufer and Solo as well as features such as the called Ace and losing Schneider. However, the 
oldest actual rule set for Bavarian Schafkopf is found in Der gewandte Kartenspieler: 2. Der Schaffkopf: ein geistreiches Kartenspiel ("The Skilful Card Player: 2. Schafkopf: an Ingenious Card Game") printed in Würzburg in 1884. This was followed a decade later by the Schafkopf-Büchlein - Detailliche Anleitung zum Lernen und Verbessern des Schafkopfspiel mit deutschen Karten, published in Amberg in 1895, in which the author explicitly explains the differences from Schafkopf variants played in northern Germany, i.e. Skat and Doppelkopf.

In the early rule sets, there were only two contracts: a Frage (now Rufer) in which the declarer called for a non-trump Ace and its holder became the declarer's partner and Hearts were always trumps; and a Solo in which the declarer entrumped any suit and played alone against three defenders. After the Second World War, other  contracts began to appear, notably Bettel and Ramsch as well as a Schieber-Solo, while in 1974, Wenz, now standard, was still being described as a variation.

The rules of the game were officially established by the Bavarian Schafkopf Society (Bayerischer Schafkopf-Verein e. V.) at the 1st Bavarian Schafkopf Congress on 17 December 1989 in Munich's Hofbräuhaus The society known as the Schafkopf School (Schafkopfschule e. V.) publishes a revised version on its website. The Schafkopf School has established itself as a kind of unofficial appeal authority for questions of rule interpretation.

Overview and aim 
Schafkopf is a four-player game in which players bid either to play with the aid of a partner or, if their hand is strong enough, to play alone against the other three players. Players receive 8 cards from a 32-card, German-suited pack in which the suit ranking is A (high) 10 K O U 9 8 7. However, the game is dominated by trumps because the trump suit is usually augmented by Obers and Unters. There is a simple auction in which players get one chance to pass or play a contract. If two offer to play, there is a priority based on the rank of the contract and the order of bidding. The winning bidder becomes the declarer and clarifies the contract.

The lowest contract and by far the most commonly played is a Rufer ("Caller") in which the declarer names a side suit Ace (not held) and the player with the called Ace becomes the silent partner, whose identity is only revealed by the play of the cards. There is a long trump suit comprising all four Obers, four Unters and all the Hearts: 14 trumps in all. The aim is not primarily to win tricks but to capture cards with a point value - especially Aces and Tens - whereby the values are A = 11, Ten = 10, King = 4, Ober = 3, Unter = 2 and the rest are 'nixers', worth nothing. Thus the overall aim is to score as many points as possible by skilful and tactical play both in partnership and or individual games. 

A player with high trumps and a long suit may risk a soloist game of which there are two in standard Schafkopf: the Wenz, in which only Unters are trumps, and the Solo in which any suit may be named as trumps alongside the usual Obers and Unters. The declarer, this time as a soloist, plays alones against the 3 defenders who band together to try and prevent the declarer from winning. In most games, the target is for the declaring team or soloist to score at least 61 of the 120 card points available. There are bonuses for scoring over 3/4 of the points or taking all eight tricks. An exception are the slam (Tout) contracts, in which the soloist must take all eight tricks to win.

Cards 
Schafkopf is a four-handed game played with a 32-card, German-suited, Bavarian or Franconian pattern pack. This is for the standard Schafkopf with 'long cards' or with a 'long pack' in which eight cards are dealt to each player. There is also a variant played with 'short cards' called Short Schafkopf.

Suits 
German packs have four suits: Acorns (Eichel), Leaves (Gras), Hearts (Herz) and Bells (Schellen).

Card values 

There are eight cards in each suit: Ace,  King, Ober, Unter, 10, 9, 8 and 7. The cards in any one suit have a collective value of 30 points; thus there are 120 points to be played for in the pack. 

The values in card points are: Ace 11, Ten 10, King 4, Ober 3, Unter 2, remainder 0.

The Obers and Unters were collectively known historically as matadors, but nowadays as lords (Herren) or bowers (Bauern).

Card names 

For historical reasons the Ace is known in Bavaria as a Sau ("Sow") and, despite having "A" as a corner index, displays two suit symbols at each end. This is because the Ace was dropped from German packs very early on and later replaced by the Deuce. The Deuces used to bear illustrations of a wild boar, hence the nickname "sow". Today, only the Ace of Bells retains a wild boar image. The King, normally König in German, is often nicknamed the Kini and many of the cards, individually or collectively have nicknames. Among the more important are the Unters which are called Wenzels, hence the name of the Wenz contract. The Nines, eights and sevens which have no point value are variously known as "sparrows" (Spatzen), "nothings" or "nixers" (Nichtser(le)), "blanks" (Leere) or "duds" (Luschen).

Standard Schafkopf 
Standard or pure (reiner) Schafkopf comprises three basic contracts – Rufer, Wenz and Solo – which are universally known and the only ones permitted at most tournaments. The following description takes account of the official rules published by the Schafkopf School in Munich.

Deal 
The four players sit crosswise as the table. Before the game begins, the first dealer is decided, usually being the player drawing the highest card from the pack. The dealer shuffles the cards, then lets the player to the right cut the pack. When cutting, at least three cards must be lifted or left. The pack may be cut up to 3 times.

The dealer deals the cards in clockwise order beginning with forehand, to the left. Each player receives 8 cards in two packets of 4 and dealt in two rounds.

The role of dealer rotates clockwise; four deals or hands make a round. In social games, the cutter may instruct the dealer to deal the cards differently e.g. "all eight" instead of 2 packets of 4, or "anti-clockwise", etc.

In tournaments, seating is pre-determined and player 1 at each table is the first dealer. To shuffle a new pack, the Sixes are removed, the cards spread over the table, face down, and shuffled by all four players. Cards are shuffled a second time by another player before cutting. The rules may specify that cards are dealt as four packets of 2 cards each.

Auction 

Before play, there is an auction to determine the declarer and which contract will be played. Players have one opportunity to bid and do so in clockwise order, beginning with forehand. 

Forehand opens by saying "pass" if not wishing to bid, or "I'll play" to bid any contract. If forehand passes, the next player in turn has the same options, and so on round the table. As soon as someone offers to 'play', a subsequent player must either fold by saying "carry on" or "good", or overcall with "I'll play too". By overcalling, a player commits to a playing a soloist contract (Wenz or Solo) and may not play a Rufer. See contracts below.

When a second bid is made, the first bidder must fold if intending to play a Rufer, or say "I'll play myself" if intending to play a Wenz or higher. If the first bidder says "I'll play myself", then the second bidder needs at least a Solo to continue. If this is the case, the second bidder says "I have a Solo" or "but not a Wenz". Again, the first bidder can hold the bid by saying "myself". The second bidder would now have to announce a Wenz Tout or Solo Tout to continue. If two players have equal bids, the earlier bidder always has the priority. Once either bidder folds, the next player(s) must overcall or fold.

The ranking of the contracts in ascending order is: Rufer, Wenz, Solo, Wenz Tout, Solo Tout, Sie.

If all pass, the cards are thrown in and the next dealer deals.

Contracts

Rufer 

A Rufer (Normalspiel, Rufspiel, Sauspiel or Partnerspiel) is the normal contract and the one played about 80% of the time. It is a partnership game in which the four Obers are the highest trumps - in the order (highest to lowest) Acorns, Leaves, Hearts and Bells – followed by the four Unters in the same order; and then the remaining Hearts cards - in the order Ace, Ten, King, Nine, Eight, Seven, making a total of 14 trumps (see table). All the rest are side suit cards and rank in the same order as the Hearts.

A player who wishes to play with the help of a partner may announce a Rufer ("Caller") and - unless someone bids a Wenz or Solo – will become the declarer. To choose a playing partner, the declarer 'calls' for any of the three non-trump Aces (A, A, A). The declarer must not have the Ace in question and must have at least one card of the same suit as the called Ace. The declarer and the owner of the called Ace then play together as a team and will combine their points won in tricks at the end. The other two become the defenders and will also combine their points.

The player with the called Ace (Rufsau = "Called Sow"), may not reveal this and is only discovered during play. Strict rules apply to the playing of the called Ace:
 It must be played if its suit is led to a trick, even if the called player has another card of that suit. 
 It may not be smeared if the led card is of a different suit, even though the called player is void in that suit.
 A player may not lead another card of the called suit while holding the called Ace back with the exception below.
 If the called player has at least 3 other cards of the called suit and that suit has not already been played, a lower card may be led or played, and the called Ace held back. This is 'running away' and the called Ace is referred to as the 'Running Sow' (Laufsau). There are no restrictions on a Running Sow; it is played as any other side suit Ace. 
 If the called Ace is not led or demanded earlier, it must be left to the last trick.

Wenz 

A Wenz (Bauernwenz or Hauswenz) overcalls a Rufer and is only outbid by a Solo. If two players bid a Wenz, the one who bid first wins. In a Wenz the declarer plays against the other three players. The only trumps are the four Unters, also known as Wenzen, hence the name of the contract. They rank from highest to lowest: U, U, U and U. The Obers ranked in their suits between the King and Nine. Hearts are no longer trumps and there is no option to name another suit as trumps as in the Suit Wenz.

Solo 

In a Solo – strictly speaking, a Suit Solo (Farbsolo) – the Obers and Unters remain the highest trumps, but the soloist is free to choose any suit as trumps, its cards then ranking in the usual Ace-Ten order (see table). In the past, a Heart Solo was sometimes ranked higher that the other Suit Solos, but that is no longer common.

Tout and Sie 
A player intending to make a slam, by taking every trick, may announce a Tout as part of the contract e.g. Wenz Tout or Acorn Solo Tout. A Tout outranks all other contracts and a Solo Tout overcalls a Wenz Tout. In a Tout, card points are irrelevant; the soloist must take every trick to win. If the defenders take a single trick – even one with no card points – the soloist loses. A Tout usually doubles the normal game value.

The highest possible contract in Schafkopf is a Sie, when a player is dealt all 4 Obers and all 4 Unters The probability of this is 1 in 10,518,300 (in short cards 1 in 134,596). It is the only game that does not have to be played out; the hand is simply placed on the table. It normally scores four times the basic game value. In many Bavarian pubs, a Sie is honoured by the custom of no longer using the cards, but framing the Sie hand on the wall together with the date and name of the player.

Doubling 
A defender who might have a stronger hand than the declarer may double the game value by announcing "Stoss!" This must be done before or as the first card of the hand is led by forehand. The declarer may redouble with "Retour!"

In some circles, doubling is announced by knocking on the table or by using other expressions such as "doppeln" or "Spritzn". Normally a token (e.g. match box, special coin) is placed on the table to confirm this. Depending on the local rules only forehand, only one player or all players may double. If more than one player doubles the game the factors are multiplied, i.e. one player 2x, two players 4x, three players 8x and four players 16x. These factors take effect after all bonuses are added. In the case of Tout the game value doubles but no Schneider or Schwarz bonus is paid. See Doubling variations.

Play 
Once the contract has been announced, forehand leads to the first trick and then the other players play a card in clockwise order. Players must follow suit (Farbzwang). If they are unable to do so, they can either play a trump or any card from a side suit. The trick is won by the highest trump or, if no trumps are played, by the highest card of the led suit. Once there are four cards on the table, the player who has won the trick picks it up and places it face down in a pile on the table. The winner of the trick leads to the next trick and so on, until all 32 cards - 8 tricks - have been played.

Failure to follow suit, criticising or verbally trying to influence the game generally results in the loss of the game.

If a trick is not yet completed (i.e. the cards are still face up on the table), each player has the right to view the previous trick on request.

Scoring 
After the play is over, card points are counted for each side and the game is scored. The declarer's team (declarer plus partner, or soloist) must score at least 61 points, which means that the defenders only need 60 to win. 

There is a bonus for Schneider: scoring 91 points or more and for Schwarz: taking all tricks. At 31 card points the declarer's team or soloist are free of Schneider (Schneider frei). For the defending team, the game is won with only 60 points, a Schneider is achieved with just 90 points and they are free of Schneider with 30 points (see table).

An exception are the slam (Tout) contracts, in which the soloist must take all eight tricks to win. If the defenders take one trick, the soloist has lost.

The scale of win and type of contract determine the game points awarded using a zero-sum system. For example, in a Rufer, a simple win earns 1 point for each partner on the winning team and costs -1 point for each loser. A soloist who wins with 61-90 card points earns 2 points from each defender for a total of 6 points, costing each defender -2 points. Social games are often played for small stakes where e.g. 1 point = 10 cents. See Scoring table.

Winners must request the right amount before cards are dealt for the next hand. If the winner overclaims, then twice the difference can be recouped by the losing team if the rules are applied strictly.

Basic tariff 
Schafkopf is not classed by the German authorities as a gambling game in the legal sense by the relevant section of the act, § 284 StGB, and may therefore be played in Germany for money. The tariff must be settled before the game starts. Especially in Bavaria it is normally played for small stakes to make it more interesting and the players more focused. 

The basic tariff is made up of a lower rate for Rufer  games (the 'unit') and a higher rate for Wenz and Solo games, usually two or more units and chosen for ease of calculation and coin size. For example, if 5 cents is the rate for a Rufer and the Wenz/Solo rate is 20 cents, the basic tariff is referred to as 5/20. In social games, the most common rates are 5/20, 10/20 and 10/50 (the Schafkopf School tariff).

Sometimes a third tariff is introduced to counteract the sometimes disproportionate effect of bonuses. For example, if the rate is 10/20/50, then 20 cents is the basic tariff for a Rufer and 50 cents for a Wenz or Solo. The Schneider bonus is 10 cents, Schwarz 20 cents (twice the Schneider rate) and there is an additional 10 cents per runner (see below).

Schneider and Schwarz 
If a team is Schneider at the end of the game, the value of the game is increased by 1 unit. If they are Schwarz it is increased by 2 units (whether the game has been won by the declarer's team or the defenders has no effect on the tariff). The payment of Schneider is a matter of honour and paid voluntarily; by contrast, Schwarz must be claimed by the winner. In Wenz and Solo, Schneider and Schwarz are not always scored in long Schafkopf, but they always are in short Schafkopf.

Scoring table 
The following example is a typical point scoring scheme for standard Schafkopf. It may be converted to a payment scheme by setting e.g. 1 point = 10 cents which corresponds to a 10/20 payment system.

Runners 
Players may agree to allow 'runners' (Laufende or Läufer), whereby if either side holds several trumps in sequence from the top (O) the winner(s) earn a bonus, each runner in the sequence raising the game value by 1. The number of runners is determined as follows:
 In a Rufer or Solo at least 3 runners must be held in sequence
 In a Wenz at least 2 runners must be held in sequence
 In tournament Schafkopf, usually a maximum of four count (i.e. only the Obers)
 In private rounds the maximum number of runners may include the Unters, or even all trump cards.

Example: Annika wins a Solo with 91 card points having had the 3 Obers. From each opponent she earns 20 cents for the win, 10 cents for Schneider (over 90) and 30 cents for runners making a total game value of 60 cents. Thus she earns 180 cents in total; each opponent paying her 60 cents.

Pot 
If playing for money, players may pre-agree that each player puts a 'sweetener' (e.g. 10 cents) into the pot (Stock, Henn or Topf) following games where the cards are thrown in. The declarer in the next hand now has the chance to win the pot. If successful, the declarer alone sweeps the pot in addition to the normal winnings shared with a partner. If unsuccessful, the declarer alone doubles the contents of the pot and play continues with the next declarer a game having an opportunity chance to win the pot.

In Schafkopf tournaments there is usually a special variant of the Stock called the Reuegeld.

Optional contracts 

Part of the rich culture of Schafkopf is the diverse range of optional contracts that may be 'bolted on' to the basic structure of classic or 'pure' Schafkopf. These contracts are rarely found at tournaments but have a permanent place in many places where Schafkopf is played for leisure. The ranking of the most common optional contracts is shown in the adjacent table alongside the standard contracts from pure Schafskopf (* = classification regionally very different).

Special partnership contracts

Hochzeit 
A player who has only one trump, may place it face down on the table and offer a Hochzeit ("Wedding"). The player who picks up the card first (the dealer invites them to do so in clockwise order) passes a non-trump card face down in exchange to the "suitor" (Hochzeiter) and becomes the partner. In the variant Bauernhochzeit ("Farmer's Wedding"), also called Doppelhochzeit ("Double Wedding"), two cards are exchanged.

The rules for Hochzeit vary slightly from region to region. For example, the rules may stipulate that the wedding card must be placed face up on the table or may only be allowed if all players have passed. In the (very rare) case that two players hold only one trump each, a Double Wedding is also possible. The declaring team is the pair that announced the first Wedding.

Kreuzbock 
The Kreuzbock, also callea a Kreuzrunde, Kreuz, Rock or Goaß is a partnership variant played, for example, if all players have passed, after a Heart Solo or after a lost Solo. Usually a full round (four hands) is played. The players facing one another across the table automatically form teams. Although rules vary from region to region, it is usually agreed that the declarer's team is:
 the team that said the last Stoss or Contra etc.
 if no Stoss or Contra has been said, the first team to lay
 if there has been no Contra or laying, the team leading to the first trick

Muss 
A  Muss is a force contract and the most common outcome in tournaments in the event that all four players pass. In this event, the owner of a particular card (almost always the O) must play the game as declarer. Muss has some special features: the game is won if the declarer's team score 60 card points and is schneider free with 30 points (correspondingly won as schneider with 90 points). In addition, no Contra may be given. If the Muss player is 'blocked' (gesperrt) by having no suit in which to call an Ace, it is permitted to renege (renonce) by calling an Ace without having a card of that suit. If the Muss player holds all three side suit Aces himself, a Ten may be called or, failing that, even a King.

Special soloist contracts 
These games, too, are generally only of regional significance, as a result only the most common are described here.

Geier 

Geier is a contract in which only the Obers are trumps. There are thus 11 trumps and the Unters take their place between the King and Nine of their respective suits. It ranks below a Wenz.

There are similar contract variants in which another card denomination is entrumped:

 Kaiser: only the Kings are trumps. Also called König, Keni, Krone, Habicht, Adler, Hühnergeier or Bart. Ranks below Geier. 
 Eisenbahner: only the Tens are trumps. Ranks below Adler and Geier
 Spatz: only the Sevens are trumps. Ranks above Wenz.

Suit Geier 
A Suit Geier (Farbgeier) is a Geier in which a suit is also nominated as trumps. Thus in a Leaf Geier, Leaves are trumps as well as the four Obers. The trump ranking in a Leaf Geier is thus: O O O O A 10 K U 9 8 7. 

The corresponding contracts for the other variants are:
 Suit Kaiser: Also called a Suit König (Farbkönig) etc. 
 Suit Eisenbahner (Farbeisenbahner).

Suit Wenz 

In a Suit Wenz (Farbwenz), the Unters are the highest trumps and, in addition, a trump suit is also chosen. The Obers revert to their normal suits which leaves eleven trumps. Thus there are four distinct contracts: Acorn Wenz (Eichewenz), Leaf Wenz (Graswenz), Heart Wenz (Herzwenz) and Bell Wenz (Schellenwenz). During the bidding process, if two players bid and need to clarify their contracts, a player need only say e.g. "I have a Suit Wenz", thus concealing their strong suit. If that player wins the auction, the suit is clarified by saying e.g. "I'm playing a "Bell Wenz".

Bettel 

A Bettel is a classic negative contract where the soloist undertakes not to take a single trick. There are no trumps and, unlike the normal contracts, cards rank in their natural order: A K O U 10 9 8 7. In settling a Bettel, the rate for a solo game is often used as the basis for calculation, sometimes a separate rate is determined. Variants include:

 Bettel Brett: a variant found in many regions which is simply a Bettel played ouvert. The declarer's cards are placed face up after the first trick. Double the value of a Bettel.
 Pfd (Mörtel or Ramsch Tout): played as a Bettel but Obers, Unters and Hearts are trumps as in a Rufer and Ace-Ten ranking is used.
 
Sometimes variants are played where the Obers and Unters are trumps, but there is no trump suit.

Special games or rounds 
Sometimes special games rounds with different rules are played after certain events (for example, Kreuzbock rounds, Doppler or Bock rounds and Ramsch rounds).

Bock games or rounds 
Bock games or rounds are those for which there is double tariff. Players may agree beforehand that they will occur, for example, after the cards are thrown in, after a lost solo or doubled game, after a game ends 60-all and/or after Schwarz or Re games. In the case of a Bock round, the next four deals are played at double the usual tariff.

Ramsch 

Ramsch is a contract often played if no-one has bid (often the 'last man' has the option of announcing Ramsch if the players bidding before him have all passed). There is no declarer and each player plays individually against everyone else. The same trump cards apply as for a Rufer, but this time the aim is to score as few card points as possible. The player with the most points loses and pays the others. If two or more players score the same number of points, the one with the most tricks loses. If the number of tricks is also equal, the player with the most trumps in the tricks loses; if that number is also equal, the player with the higher trump loses. Special rules adapted from Skat are the Durchmarsch or Mord, which correspond to a "sweep" or "slam", i.e. one player takes all the tricks to wins the game, and Jungfrau ("maiden") (i.e. one or two players do not make a trick, the loser pays twice or four times). There are no fixed rules for settling a Ramsch contract: either the loser pays the basic rate or a specially agreed rate to all players or the two players with the most points pay to the other two.

A variation is Schieberamsch, a  local variant, where the tricks are passed on clockwise at the end of the game, and where the player who has the fewest points at the end also wins.

Schieber 
In a Schieber or Schiebersolo the O and O (the 2 highest lords) are removed from the pack before dealing; the dealer deals as usual, but receives only 6 cards. Forehand picks up the 2 cards and must decide whether to pass them on or play a Solo. Either way, forehand passes (pushes or schiebt) any two cards face down to middlehand. If they are the two lords, middlehand has the same choice. This continues until the third player passes two cards to the dealer, who now has 8 cards. The player who has the two lords announces trumps and must play a Solo against the rest. If none wishes to play a Solo the cards are either thrown in. Schieber is also possible with 3 cards being set aside or with 4 cards, in which case all 4 Obers are removed and the Solo must be determined before the cards are dealt.

Related to four-card Schieber is the Devil's Round (Teufelsrunde) from Munich. Forehand is given the O, O, O and U and must announce the Solo before any cards are dealt.

Other special rounds 
From the multitude of these often just regionally interesting special contracts only a more or less arbitrary selection is described here:
 Hadschader (also Hatschate,<ref name=Kraddler>[https://bibel-forum.de.tl/Kraddler_Schoafn.htm Spielregeln für den "unreinen" Schafkopf.] at bibel-forum.de. Retrieved 20 April 2022.</ref> Hadsch or Hatsch): After a lost solo, a round played in which forehand must always play and is automatically stossed.
 Allgäu Round (Allgäuer Runde, Chiprunde, Fisiko, Drei-Kombi-Muss): three rounds are played, during which each player has to play a Rufer, a Wenz and a Solo.
 Strixner: there is no auction and players compete individually under normal rules. Whoever wins the third trick, must announce a solo contract.
 Zupf Solo: the soloist is allowed to draw (zupften) any card fron another player's hand and give any card in exchange (Bavarian Swabia).
 Minas is when, after a Solo has been won, a round of forced Solos is played. In each case forehand must play a Solo of his or her choice. After the end of the round the player with the poorest Solo result makes a pre-agreed payment to the three winners. (Mönchberg, Unterfranken)

 Last round 
A Schafkopf session traditionally ends with the words "the old man deals the last round" (Der Alte gibt die letzte Runde).
The player who last had the O in a Rufer, then deals the first hand of the final round. For the last round, special rules sometimes apply (double game values, only Solo games or the like).

 Other variations 
 Doubling 
In addition to the official procedure for doubling, there are a number of variations.
 Alternative announcements to Stoss: Contra, Kontra or Spritze Alternatives announcements to Retour: Re, Gegenstoß.
 Doubling escalation: e.g. after Stoss! and Retour further doubling calls such as Sub, Re-Sub, etc., are allowed, each one further doubling the game value.
 Doubling on the First (Card): the official procedure whereby doubling is only allowed as the first card is led to the first trick.
 Doubling with Eight Cards: players may double as they play their first card and redouble as they play their second.
 A common practice is for the defending team to 'take over' the game (Kontra übernimmt), thus requiring them to score 61 points to win.
 Laying (Legen): after picking up their first packet of 4 cards (3 in Short Schafkopf), players may 'lay' (legen) in clockwise order i.e. double the game by laying down a coin or other object, the Leger. Each Leger doubles the game.
 Knocking (Klopfen): after picking up their first packet of 4 cards (3 in Short Schafkopf), players may 'knock (klopfen) in clockwise order; each knock doubles the game. 
 A stricter rule is that only the player leading may lay, or a second player may only lay if the player before him has done so - "one after the other" (nacheinander) as opposed to "all over the place" (durcheinander).

 Scoring in 'impure' Schafkopf 
Taking all the possible contracts, bonuses and doubling mechanisms, results in the following scheme for calculating the game value if G is the basic tariff (Grundtarif) or payment unit for a Rufer:

 Variants 
 Short Schafkopf 

A popular variant in parts of eastern Bavarian (Upper Palatinate and Upper Franconia) is 'short' Schafkopf (Kurzer Schafkopf), also called 'sharp' Schafkopf Scharfer Schafkopf), which is played with just 24 cards, the 7s and 8s being removed. This is called playing with 'short cards' (Kurze Karten) and each player only receives 6 instead of the usual 8 cards. Playing short Schafkopf makes the game faster and alters some playing tactics because of the changed probabilities. The cards are more frequently thrown in and partnership games are less common. Sometimes the 9s are removed to leave just 20 cards in the game and players are then dealt 5 cards each. Short cards are sold in packs labelled Kurze Scharfe ("Short Sharp Ones"), a pun on scharf ("sharp") and Schaf ("sheep").

Short Schafkopf is played in Upper Franconia, Upper Palatinate, as well as parts of Middle Franconia, Lower Bavaria and the Palatinate. It is also played in the county of Main Tauber Kreis.

A shortened pack is also used for three-hand Schafkopf, players still receiving eight cards as in standard Schafkopf. However, only solo games are possible.

 Two-, Three- and Five-Hand Schafkopf 
The following variants exist for two, three or five players:

 Two-hand Schafkopf (Schafkopf zu zweit): also called Open Schafkopf (Aufgelegter Schafkopf), Farmer's Schafkopf (Bauernschafkopf) or Officers' Schafkopf (Offiziersschafkopf), a Schafkopf-like game with diverse rules. See also Officers' Skat and Two-Player Wendish Schafkopf.
 Three-hand Schafkopf (Schafkopf zu dritt): the game is played with 'short cards'. Each player is dealt 8 cards and only Solo or Wenz are played. It is not permitted in tournaments.
 Five-hand Schafkopf (Schafkopf zu fünft): as per normal Schafkopf, but the dealer sits out.

 Bierkopf 

Bierkopf ("beer head") is a very simplified form of Schafkopf that is a useful entry-level game. Players play in fixed partnerships, there is no auction and trumps are fixed as Obers, Unters and Hearts, as in a Rufer. The game is highly popular in Franconia where it is often played for Masses (litres) of beer. It has been reproduced as an app by Rackoon.

 Mucken 

Mucken is a form intermediate between Bierkopf and Schafkopf. Again, there are fixed partnerships and no soloist games, but there is an auction and range of contracts with different trump mixes. Like Bierkopf, it is popular in Franconia and has also been produced as an app by Rackoon.

 Tournament Schafkopf 

Schafkopf, as a genuine leisure pursuit, is, by definition, not organized; nevertheless, many clubs in public life, such as sports or shooting clubs, but also breweries and restaurants, regularly organize Schafkopf tournaments in Bavaria, where they are also called Schafkopfrennen ("Schafkopf races"). Despite the comparatively uniform rules of these tournaments, there are still considerable regional differences.

 Schafkopf in culture 
Recently, the declining importance of the Schafkopf game as a leisure activity, especially among young people, has been discussed in Bavarian media. This has also been viewed at the municipal level as an imminent loss of part of Bavarian identity; countermeasures are therefore receiving increasingly wide support. More and more adult education centres in Bavaria offer Schafkopf courses.

Schafkopf has its own language, known as Schafkopf-Sprache which is not always intelligible to outsiders. The game has also entered Bavarian culture in other ways:

 Literature and media 
 In a Bavarian version of the song Herz ist Trumpf (Dann rufst du an …) ("Hearts are Trumps (then call [me]...)") by Trio, Max Griesser describes the course of a Hearts Solo during a game of Schafkopf. 
 The crime thriller Schafkopf by Andreas Föhr also deals with the game.
 Schafkopf – a bissel was geht immer is the title of an early evening programme which was aired by German broadcaster, ZDF in 2012. It stars a female detective, Sandra (played by Marlene Morreis), who plays Schafkopf regularly with 3 companions - a police officer, lawyer and priest – who routinely help her solve crime in her local Bavarian town.

 Ceremonies 
In some localities, the local Schafkopf club holds an 'Eichelober Ball', electing one of their number as the 'Eichelober' (Ober of Acorns), who wears a fancy hat and presides over ceremonial activities. He may be accompanied by Queen of the Ball. The ball may be funded by the penalty money amassed during the year by playing the game.

 Records 
Until 2006, the Guinness Book of Records recognized card game records only if they were based on a French deck of 52 cards. Only after the intervention of Bavarian broadcasters, Bayerischer Rundfunk, was this rule relaxed and Schafkopf was recognized in this category; since then the record for continuous playing has been held exclusively by Schafkopf groups (for medical reasons the Guinness rules allow two substitutes). The officially recognized record playing time is currently 260 hours, placed in November 2013 by one Munich group.

See also
Schafkopf language
Bierkopf
Mucken
German Schafkopf
Doppelkopf

Notes

 References 

 Bibliography 
 Altenburger Spielfabrik, Erweitetes Spielregelbüchlein aus Altenburg, 8th edition, Dresden (1988), pp. 177–180.
 Danyliuk, Rita. 1x1 der Kartenspiele. 19th edition. Hanover: Humboldt (2017), pp. 32–38. 
 Danyliuk, Rita (2013). Schafkopf und Doppelkopf - Für Anfänger und Fortgeschrittene. Regeln und Taktik. Praktische Tipps Hanover: Humboldt. .
 Grupp, Claus D. Doppelkopf Schafkopf. Niedernhausen: Falken (1994). .
 Grupp, Claus D. Karten-spiele, Niederhausen: Falken (1975/1979), pp. 111–114. .
 Hammer, Paul (1811). Die deutschen Kartenspiele oder Anleitung die üblichen gesellschaftlichen Spiele mit der deutschen Karte als Solo, Kontra, Schafkopf....zu lernen. Leipzig.
 Hartmann, Andreas Gottlieb (1780). Die Dankbare Tochter. Leipzig and Budissin: Deinzer. 
 Jedelhauser, Philipp (2018). „Das Schafkopfspiel, Vergnügen und Tradition“, in Burgau aktuell, No. 97, November 2018, pp. 25/26, Accessible in the Internet at Stadtzeitung Burgau aktuell.
 Jups. Mangold (1884). Der gewandte Kartenspieler: 2. Der Schaffkopf: ein geistreiches Kartenspiel. Würzburg: Stahel.  
 Lembke, Robert (1974). Das Große Haus- und Familienbuch der Spiele. Cologne: Lingen.
 Merschbacher, Adam (2009). Schafkopf: Das anspruchsvolle Kartenspiel. Munich: Pliz.
 "Obsis" (1895). Schafkopf-Büchlein - Detailliche Anleitung zum Lernen und Verbessern des Schafkopfspiel mit deutschen Karten, Amberg (Oberpfalz).
 Parlett, David. The Penguin Book of Card Games. London: Penguin (2008), pp. 225–229. .
 Peschel, Wolfgang (1990). Bayerisch Schaffkopfen: Wissenswertes - Humoriges - Offizielle Spielreglen, 2nd edn. Weilheim: Stöppel.
 Schaffer, Georg (1956). Schafkopf und Tarock. Minden (Westphalia): Albrecht Philler.
 Schmeller, Johann Andreas (1837). Bayerisches Wörterbuch Vols. III. and IV., Munich 1837,  2nd edn. 1877 (combined into Vol. 2) by Georg Karl Frommann, p. 378.
 Schwarzmann, L. [J.B.C–.] (1876). "Das edle Schafkopf-Spiel" in Regensburger Conversations-Blatt (Beiblatt zum Regensburger Tagblatt), Nro. 4. Sunday 9 January 1876. Regensburg: J. Reitmayr.
 _ (1843) Bayer. Staatsbibliothek: Oberpfälzisches Zeitblatt'', 3rd annual edn., Amberg, Saturday 10 June, p. 375 (in Internet).

External links
 Sauspiel site dedicated to Schafkopf (in German)
 The School of Schafkopf with the official rules (in English and German)
 Traditionelles Stammtisch-Vergnügen - Schafkopfen (in German)
 Anleitung - rules for 'short' Schafkopf (in German)

18th-century card games
 
German inventions
Four-player card games
Bavarian card games
German deck card games
Point-trick games
Card games introduced in the 1840s